Kasese is a town north of Lake George in the Western Region of Uganda.  It originally grew around the copper mine at Kilembe, while attention later turned to cobalt mining. It is the chief town of Kasese District, and the district headquarters are located there. Kasese is also the largest town in the Rwenzururu region. Charles Mumbere, the Omusinga of Rwenzururu, maintains a palace in the town.

Location
Kasese is at the western end of the Uganda Railway to Kampala and Tororo and is home to Kasese Airport. The city is near the Rwenzori Mountains and Queen Elizabeth National Park.

The coordinates of Kasese are 0°11'12.0"N, 30°05'17.0"E (Latitude:0.186667; Longitude:30.088050).

Population
The national census of 1969 enumerated the population of Kasese Town at 7,213 people. In 1980, the census that year put the population of the town at 9,917. In 1991, the national census numerated 18,750 inhabitants in Kasese. That population had increased to 85,697 people, according to the 2002 national census. On 27 August 2014, the census and national housing survey enumerated 101,065 people in Kasese Town Council.

In 2020, the Uganda Bureau of Statistics (UBOS), estimated the mid-year population of the town at 115,400 inhabitants. UBOS calculated that the population of Kasese Municipality increased at an average rate of 2.3 percent annually, between 2014 and 2020.

Population dynamics

During the 1990s Kasese Town was one of the fastest growing municipalities in Uganda. The reasons for this rapid population growth include:

 Increased tourism - Kasese is the gateway to Queen Elizabeth National Park, one of the most popular in Uganda, and the Rwenzori National Park.
 Kilembe Mines employs a large number of workers; over 3,000 as of January 2015.
 Increased trade with the eastern districts of the DRC.

Industry

Kasese Cobalt Company Limited (KCCL), located on the road from Kasese to Rubirizi just south of the central business district of Kasese, extracts cobalt from the sludge left after copper is extracted from the raw ore.

Points of interest

The following points of interest lie within the town or close to its edges:
 Seat of Obusinga Bwa Rwenzururu
 headquarters of Kasese District
 offices of Kasese town council
 Kasese central market
 branch of the National Social Security Fund
 Hima Cement Limited
 Kasese Airport
 Kilembe Cobalt Company Limited
 Kilembe Mines - Extraction of copper. Maintains a private hospital and a 5 megawatt mini-hydropower plant, Mubuku I Power Station, that supplies the town of Kasese.
 Kilembe Mines Hospital - A 200-bed community hospital administered by Kilembe Mines Limited.

See also
 List of cities and towns in Uganda
 Kagando Hospital
 Railway stations in Uganda

References

External links

 Kasese Leaders Question Omission from Elevated Cities As of 29 May 2019.
 Kasese municipality records major leap in revenue collections As of 22 May 2021.

.
Rwenzururu sub-region
Cities in the Great Rift Valley
Populated places in Western Region, Uganda